Matthew James Booth is an English actor from Normanton, West Yorkshire. He is well known for playing the role of postman Paul Marsden on ITV's Emmerdale from 2003 until the character's death in 2004. He has also appeared in Coronation Street, At Home with the Braithwaites, The Royal, The Ward and Hollyoaks. He is a lifelong fan of Manchester United F.C. and once appeared in a Vodafone commercial with David Beckham.

References

External links

Year of birth missing (living people)
Living people
English male actors
Male actors from Yorkshire
Actors from Wakefield